A coot is a water bird.

Coot or Coots may also refer to:


People
 Jamie Coots (1971–2014), American Pentecostal pastor and snake handler
 John Frederick Coots, American songwriter who wrote "Santa Claus is Coming to Town"
 Ed "Coots" Matthews, co-founder of Boots & Coots, a company specializing in putting out oil well fires

Aircraft
 the NATO reporting name of four Soviet airplanes:
 Coot, the second version of the Ilyushin Il-18, or a generic designation for the Il-18, Il-20, Il-22 and Il-24
 Coot-A, the Ilyushin Il-20 (1948)
 Coot-B, the Ilyushin Il-22, an airborne command center version of the Il-18
 Coot-C, the Ilyushin Il-24, an unbuilt variant
 Taylor Coot, an amphibious civilian airplane built by Moulton Taylor

Other uses
 Coot (vehicle), a four-wheel-drive articulated amphibious ATV built in the U.S. from 1967 to 1985
 Coot (trawler), the first Icelandic trawler
 Coots Lake, a lake in Georgia
 Coot Kin, a family of cartoon characters
 Coot (software), Crystallographic Object-Oriented Toolkit, a free chemistry software
 the Colby Outdoor Orientation Trips at Colby College, Maine

See also
 Coote (disambiguation)
 Koot (disambiguation)